St Mary's Church, Car Colston is a Grade I listed parish church in the Church of England in Car Colston.

History

The church dates from the 13th century. The tower was restored in 1911.

The church is in a joint parish with St Wilfrid's Church, Screveton.

The church yard includes 3 headstones which are Grade II listed.  
That to left has shouldered arched top and incised scrolls, to Elenor Wollerton, 1762. Signed 'James Sparrow'. 
Central square headed stone has scrollwork and foliate borders. In the style of J. Sparrow. To John Woolerton, 1740. 
That to right has stepped arched head and scrollwork. To Thomas Woolerton, 1739. Signed 'J. Sparrow fecit'.

Memorials

Memorials include: 
Gregorius Henson, 1613
Blagg family, 1876
Robert Thoroton 1905, Brass signed 'Gawthorp Sc. London' 
Thomas Blagg, 1795
Francis Blagg, 1814

References

Church of England church buildings in Nottinghamshire
Car Colston